Vagn Hedeager (21 August 1939 – 22 September 2017) was a Danish footballer. He played in one match for the Denmark national football team in 1967.

References

External links
 

1939 births
2017 deaths
Danish men's footballers
Denmark international footballers
Place of birth missing
Association footballers not categorized by position